This page lists bands and musicians that originate from Finland.

#

22-Pistepirkko
The 69 Eyes

A

Aavikko
Absoluuttinen Nollapiste
Advanced Art
Agents
Agit-prop
Agonizer
Aikakone
Ajattara
Aknestik
Alamaailman Vasarat
Albert Järvinen
Alivaltiosihteeri
Altaria
Am I Blood
Amberian Dawn
Amoral
Amorphis
Ancara
...and Oceans
Angel of Sodom
Angelit
Anzi Destruction
Apocalyptica
Appendix
Apulanta
Archgoat
Arion
Arthemesia
Auri
Avanti! Chamber Orchestra
Avarus
Azaghal

B

Baptism
Barathrum
Barren Earth
Los Bastardos Finlandeses
Bat & Ryyd
Battle Beast
Battlelore
Beast in Black
Beat
Beats And Styles
Before the Dawn
Beherit
Behexen
Ben Granfelt Band
Bitch Alert
The Black League
Blind Channel
Bloodpit
Blues Section
Bob Malmström
Bomfunk MC’s
Boulevard
Brother Firetribe
Brymir
Burning Point

C

Cadacross
Cain's Offering
Callisto
Cardiant
Catamenia
CatCat
Charon
Children Of Bodom
Chromatic Dark
Circle
Club For Five
CMX
Collarbone
Come Inside
The Crash
Crystal Blaze

D

Dallapé
Dallas Superstars
Damn Seagulls
Daniel Lioneye
The Dark Element
Dark Sarah
Dark the Suns
Darude
Dawn of Solace
Death Hawks
Deathbound
Deathchain
Deep Insight
Demigod
Demilich
Demolition 23
Deuteronomium
Diablo
Dingo
Disco Ensemble
DJ Kridlokk
Dolorian
Don Huonot
Don Johnson Big Band
Doom Unit
Dreamtale

E

Edea
Egotrippi
Elokuu
Elonkerjuu
Elonkorjuu
Eläkeläiset
Ember Falls
End of You
Ensiferum
Entwine
Eppu Normaali
Ernos
Eternal Tears of Sorrow
Eurocrack
Excalion

F

Falchion
Fanu
Farmakon
Feiled
Finlanders
Finnforest
Finntroll
Fintelligens
Firevision
The Flaming Sideburns
Flinch
For My Pain...
French Films
Frigg
Fröbelin Palikat

G

G-Powered
Ghost Brigade
GG Caravan

H

Haloo Helsinki!
Hanoi Rocks
Happoradio
Harmaja
Hasse Walli
Hassisen Kone
Hateform
Havoc Unit
HB
HC Andersen
Hehkumo
Hevein
Hevisaurus
HIM
Horna
Hurriganes
Husky Rescue

I

Iconcrash
Imatran Voima
Immortal Souls
Impaled Nazarene
Indica
Insomnium

J

Janne Westerlund
Jeavestone
Jormas
JPP
JS16
Jukka Tolonen
Justimus
JVG
Järjestyshäiriö

K

K-X-P
Kaaos
Kaj Chydenius
Kalmah
Kapasiteettiyksikkö
Kapteeni Ä-ni
Kaseva
Katra
Kemialliset Ystävät
Kemopetrol
Kerkko Koskinen
Killer
Killer Aspect
Kilpi
Kimmo Pohjonen
Kingston Wall
Kiuas
Kivimetsän Druidi
Klamydia
Kliff
Kolmas Nainen
Korpiklaani
Kotipelto
Kotiteollisuus
Krypts
KYPCK
Kuunkuiskaajat
Kwan
Kylähullut

L

LAB
Lapinlahden Linnut
Lapko
The Latebirds
Leevi and the Leavings
Leningrad Cowboys
Liimanarina
Lodger
Loituma
Lord Est
Lordi
Lost Society
Lovex
Lullacry
Jaakko Löytty

M

Machine Men
Magyar Posse
Maj Karma
Major Label
Mamba
The Man-Eating Tree
Mana Mana
Mannhai
Martti Vainaa & Sallitut aineet
Masquerade
Matti ja Teppo
Mehida
The Micragirls
Mieskuoro Huutajat
Minotauri
Misery Inc.
Mokoma
Moonsorrow
Moottörin Jyrinä
Mors Principium Est
Motelli Skronkle
Movetron
Musta Paraati
myGRAIN

N

National Napalm Syndicate
Negative
Neljä Ruusua
Neljänsuora
Nest
Neuroactive
Nightwish
Norma John
Norther
Northern Kings
Notkea Rotta
Noumena
Nylon Beat

O

Omnium Gatherum
One Morning Left
Op:l Bastards
Oranssi Pazuzu

P

Paavoharju
Pain Confessor
Pan Sonic
Pariisin Kevät
Paul Oxley's Unit
Peer Günt
Penniless
Pertti Kurikan Nimipäivät
Pharaoh Overlord
Pihasoittajat
PMMP
Poets of the Fall
Pohjannaula
Poisonblack
Popeda
Private Line
Profane Omen

R

Radiopuhelimet
Rajaton
Raptori
Rapture
The Rasmus
Rattus
Rautakoura
Reckless Love
Regina
Renascent
Reverend Bizarre
Revolution Renaissance
Rifftera
RinneRadio
Ripsipiirakka
Roope Salminen & Koirat
Rotten Sound
Rubik
Ruoska
Russian Love
RUST
Rytmihäiriö
Rättö ja Lehtisalo

S

Santa Cruz
Sapattivuosi
Sara
Sargeist
Satanic Warmaster
Satellite Stories
Satin Circus
Saturnian Mist
Scandinavian Music Group
The Scourger
Seminaarinmäen mieslaulajat
Sentenced
Shade Empire
Shape of Despair
Shooting Gallery
Sielun Veljet
SIG
Silent Voices
Silentium
Sinamore
Sinergy
Sir Elwoodin hiljaiset värit
Skepticism
Sleepy Sleepers
Slipping Stitches
Smack
Snow White's Poison Bite
Softengine
Solution 13
Sonata Arctica
Sotajumala
Soulcage
Spiritus Mortis
Stalingrad Cowgirls
Stam1na
Stella
Steve 'N' Seagulls
Stone
Stratovarius
Sturm und Drang
Suburban Tribe
The Suicide Twins
Sunrise Avenue
Suomen Talvisota 1939–1940
Symfonia
Swallow the Sun

T

Tarot
Tasavallan Presidentti
Tehosekoitin
Tenhi
Teräsbetoni 
Terveet Kädet
Throes of Dawn
Thunderstone
Thy Serpent
Timo Rautiainen & Trio Niskalaukaus
Timo Tolkki's Avalon
To/Die/For
Topmost
Torture Killer
Tracedawn
Trees of Eternity
Trio Töykeät
Tsuumi Sound System
Tuomo & Markus
Turisas
Turmion Kätilöt
Turo's Hevi Gee
TV-resistori
Twilight Guardians
Twilight Ophera
Twilightning
Two Witches

U

Ultra Bra
UltraNoir
Uniklubi
Unshine

V

The Valkyrians
Ville Valo
Valvomo
Velcra
Verjnuarmu
Vesterinen Yhtyeineen
Viikate
Vilddas
Villieläin
Villa Nah
VIRTA
Von Hertzen Brothers
Värttinä

W

Waldo's People
Waltari
Warmen
Wigwam
Wiidakko
Winterborn
Wintersun
Wöyh!

X

Xysma

Y

YUP
Yö
Yölintu
Yön Polte

Z

Zen Café
Zook

See also
 List of Finnish singers
 List of Finnish musicians
 List of Finnish jazz musicians

Bands
Bands